The Advanced Media Workflow Association (AMWA) is an industry association focused on the content creation industry's move to IP-based architectures. AMWA promotes industry standards that allow diverse devices to discover and interoperate with each other reliably and securely.

Work 

As part of AMWA's collaborative process AMWA specifications are published on GitHub.

AMWA's Framework for Interoperable Media Service (FIMS) integrates a common approach to integrate hardware devices and software components in TV production facilities

Networked Media Open Specification (NMOS) provides discovery, registration and control services for the SMPTE ST2110 suite.

The Advanced Authoring Format (AAF) is a multimedia file format for professional media creators.  AAF provides cross-platform data interchange, designed for the video post-production and authoring environment.

AAF and Material Exchange Format (MXF) are successors to Open Media Framework (OMF).

Published specifications 
AMWA publishes interface specifications, data models, best current practices and application specifications.

interface specifications 

 IS-01: AAF C++ SDK reference implementation.
 IS-03: Media Authoring with Java (MAJ) API
 IS-04: NMOS Discovery & Registration API
 IS-05: NMOS Device Connection Management API
 IS-06: NMOS Network Control
 IS-07: NMOS Event & Tally API
 IS-08: NMOS Audio Channel Mapping
 IS-09: NMOS System Parameters
 IS-10: NMOS Authorization

Data models 

 MS-01: AAF Data Model (SMPTE 2033 – in progress).
 MS-02: Mapping from AAF objects to Structured Storage
 MS-03: Structured Storage Specification
 MS-04: A model for identity and timing in AMWA NMOS specifications.

Best current practices 

 BCP-001-02: AMWA Specification Process
 BCP-002-01: Natural Grouping of NMOS Resources
 BCP-003-01: Secure Communication in NMOS Systems
 BCP-003-02: Authorization in NMOS Systems
 BCP-003-03: Certificate provisioning in NMOS Systems

Application specifications 

 AS-01: AAF Edit Protocol
 AS-02: MXF Versioning (was MXF Mastering Format)
 AS-03: MXF Program Delivery
 AS-05: AAF Effects Protocol
 AS-07: MXF Archive & Preservation
 AS-10: MXF for Production
 AS-11: Media Contribution File Formats
 AS-12: MXF Commercial Delivery

History 

The AMWA began in January 2000 as the Advanced Authoring Format Association. The organization's name was officially changed in May 2007.

References

External links

AMWA Official website

2000 establishments in Wisconsin
Trade associations based in the United States
Organizations based in Madison, Wisconsin